SM City San Fernando Downtown, also known as SM City San Fernando, is a shopping mall owned and operated by SM Prime Holdings. It is located along V. Tiomico Street and Consunji Street in the Downtown Heritage District, Barangay Santo Rosario, San Fernando, Pampanga. It is the third SM supermall in the province of Pampanga after SM City Pampanga in San Fernando and Mexico, Pampanga and SM City Clark in the Clark Freeport Zone, Angeles City. It features more than 100 shops.

Location
SM City San Fernando Downtown is located along V. Tiomico Street and Consunji Street in the Downtown Heritage District, Barangay Santo Rosario, City of San Fernando, Pampanga, Philippines. The mall is adjacent to the Metropolitan Cathedral and the city hall of San Fernando.

Architecture
The mall opened on July 20, 2012. Its distinctive exterior design complies with the architectural theme of a heritage area, as mandated by the local government of the city. The seven-storey mall has a SM Department Store and an SM Supermarket as anchor tenants, and a three-level parking building that is directly connected to the mall.

References

SM Prime
Shopping malls in Pampanga
Buildings and structures in San Fernando, Pampanga
2012 establishments in the Philippines